Michel Courtemanche (born December 11, 1964) is a Canadian comedian and actor from Quebec, performing in Quebec, France, Belgium and Switzerland.

Career 
His debut one-man show, A New Comic is Born, ran for more than five hundred performances and earned him two Felix nominations. It was first performed in Montreal in 1989. His second, The New Adventures of Michel Courtemanche, first performed in 1992, filled theatres in both North America and Europe and spawned his second international hit video (1993).

Courtemanche has internationally sold out large theatres, and has inspired a hardcover comic book. Courtemanche appeared in Québécois films Nuit de Noces and Karmina 2, and on the Secret Adventures of Jules Verne television series, on American pay television channel Syfy.

His style of comedy can be described as mime combined with sound effects, as he is most often seen interacting with invisible objects or even people and using his voice to complete the scene. He is also known for making remarkable grimaces.

In 2002, he moved from acting to working behind the camera. His production company, Encore Télévision, produces the French-Canadian edition of the sitcom Caméra café, which was adapted from French television.

Awards and honors 
 Asteroid 63129 Courtemanche, discovered by Swiss astronomer Stefano Sposetti in 2000, was named in his honor. The official  was published by the Minor Planet Center on June 13, 2006.

Filmography 
 1997 : La ballade de Titus
 2000 : Secret adventures of Jules Verne
 2021 : Livrés chez vous sans contact

See also 
 Culture of Quebec
 Humour of Quebec
 List of Quebec comedians

References

External links 
 
 YouTube - Michel Courtemanche: Golfer 

Canadian male comedians
Comedians from Quebec
People from Laval, Quebec
1964 births
Living people
Canadian stand-up comedians
20th-century Canadian comedians
21st-century Canadian comedians